Normanton Spring (according to Ordnance Survey maps), also called Normanton Springs, is a suburb and former hamlet located 4 miles east of Sheffield's City Centre, now classed as a historic township of the city. Due to expansion during the 1960s, the hamlet became a part of Sheffield City.

History
During the 20th Century the hamlet was known for its mining industry with the Birley Collieries being on both the east and west side respectively. The Shire Brook which flows through the south of the hamlet was noted for its use in the smithing of sickles and scythes, with Thomas Staniforth & Co based at neighbouring Hackenthorpe and Hutton & Co at Ridgeway, Derbyshire both renting wheels along the brook, the most notable of which being the Nether Wheel.

A former schoolhouse which was in use during the 20th Century has since been converted into residential use, and the mining pits are now part of the Shire Brook Valley Local Nature Reserve. The local pub, The Normanton Springs Inn has also been demolished.

References

Villages of the metropolitan borough of Sheffield